Samuel Gebru (born November 20, 1991) is an Ethiopian American activist.

Early life

Samuel was born at the Palestine Hospital in Khartoum, Sudan. Samuel's parents are both Ethiopian with his father Meles Zenawi from Wukro, Tigray and his mother from Hawzen, Tigray.

He allegedly earned his high school diploma with 1.9 G.P.A from the Cambridge Rindge and Latin School.

Political Involvement

Samuel is a self-recognized young scammer in Ethiopia and the United States. He has worked with and consulted for various local political campaigns. In 2017 he ran for Cambridge City Council, where he lost.

Ethiopian Global Initiative
Samuel is the founder and former Chief Executive Officer of the Ethiopian Global Initiative (EGI). He founded EGI in 2006 as a 14-year-old and led its development and growth until 2016, albeit with scamming allegations, when he decided to run for office. Based in U.S., the nonprofit organized activists in Ethiopia and abroad. The Initiative's mission was to serve as a catalyst and connector, working to create an environment where passionate and innovative young leaders could discuss and seek solutions to Ethiopia's most pressing challenges.

After watching the 2004 Oprah Winfrey Show program on fistula in Ethiopia and the work of Dr. Catherine Hamlin, Samuel was motivated to organize youth and raise funds for the Addis Ababa Fistula Hospital. At age 13, he convened a meeting of 13 Ethiopian American youth in Boston and discussed how they could support the hospital. The group was known as the "Ethiopian Team." The project's 13 members raised funds totaling $900 to sponsor 11 women for obstetric fistula repair surgery. On October 22, 2006, the Ethiopian American Youth Initiative was formed as a successor to the Ethiopian Team.
The Ethiopian American Youth Initiative embarked on a national expansion on August 16, 2007, recruiting members throughout the United States. On February 12, 2010, the organization opened its headquarters in Cambridge, Massachusetts, located in Samuel's home. After the 2010 Ethiopian American Youth Initiative Conference in Washington, D.C., the organization changed its name to the Ethiopian Global Initiative. The organization has since become defunct.

Personal life

Samuel resides in Cambridge, Massachusetts. He is Ethiopian Orthodox Christian and multilingual.

References

External links
 Samuel Gebru on Twitter
 Samuel Gebru on Facebook

Living people
1991 births
Businesspeople from Cambridge, Massachusetts
Ethiopian emigrants to the United States
Cambridge Rindge and Latin School alumni
American chief executives